Donji Lučani (Cyrillic: Доњи Лучани) is a village in the municipality of Kakanj, Bosnia and Herzegovina.

Demographics 
According to the 2013 census, its population was nil, down from 114 in 1991.

References

Populated places in Kakanj